Kenia Seoane Lopez (born January 14, 1974) is an American attorney and jurist serving as an associate judge of the Superior Court of the District of Columbia. She previously served as a magistrate judge of the same court from 2012 to 2022.

Early life and education 
Lopez was born in Santiago de Cuba, Cuba and moved to the United States before her 10th birthday. Lopez earned a Bachelor of Science degree in criminal justice from Northeastern University in 1997, a Master of Arts in Latin American, Caribbean, and Iberian studies from the University of Wisconsin–Madison, and a Juris Doctor from the University of Wisconsin Law School in 2002.

Career 
After law school, Lopez was a clerk for the Massachusetts Superior Court. She then joined office of the attorney general for the District of Columbia, working in the legal services division of the child support department. She later served as a bilingual attorney negotiator in the domestic violence division of the Superior Court of the District of Columbia. She was nominated as a magistrate judge of the Superior Court in 2012. In June 2021, President Joe Biden announced his intent to nominate Lopez as a judge of the Superior Court. On September 14, 2021, a hearing on her nomination was held before the Senate Homeland Security and Governmental Affairs Committee. On October 6, 2021, her nomination was reported out of committee by a voice vote. On February 1, 2022, cloture was invoked on her nomination in a 59–38 vote. On February 2, she was confirmed by a 59–38 vote. She was sworn in on February 25, 2022.

References 

1974 births
Living people
21st-century American judges
21st-century American women judges
21st-century American women lawyers
21st-century American lawyers
American judges of Cuban descent
Hispanic and Latino American judges
Judges of the Superior Court of the District of Columbia
Naturalized citizens of the United States
Northeastern University alumni
People from Palma Soriano
University of Wisconsin–Madison alumni
University of Wisconsin Law School alumni